Solingen Vogelpark station is in the city of Solingen in the German state of North Rhine-Westphalia. It is on the Düsseldorf–Solingen railway, which was opened on was opened on 3 January 1894 by the Prussian state railways. The station was also opened in 1976 or 1977 and it is classified by Deutsche Bahn as a category 5 station.

The station is served by line S 1 of the Rhine-Ruhr S-Bahn, running between Düsseldorf and Solingen every 20 minutes at Monday till Friday up to 8 o'clock pm, every 30 minutes during weekend and workingdays after 8 o'clock pm.

It is also served by three bus routes, operated by Rheinbahn: 782 and 783 (both operated at 20-minute intervals to Hilden and Düsseldorf) and 792 (to Haan) operated at 20 to 60 minute intervals).

References

Rhine-Ruhr S-Bahn stations
S1 (Rhine-Ruhr S-Bahn)
Buildings and structures in Solingen
Railway stations in Germany opened in 1976
Railway stations in Germany opened in 1977